Samuel Davies may refer to:
 Samuel W. Davies (died 1843), mayor of Cincinnati
 Samuel Davies (clergyman) (1723–1761), president of Princeton University
 Samuel Richard Davies (1867–1907), English football player
 Samuel Davies (priest) (1879–1963), Welsh Anglican priest

See also
Sam Davies (disambiguation)
Samuel Davis (disambiguation)